Speke Garston is a Liverpool City Council Ward, within the Garston and Halewood Parliamentary constituency. It was formed for the 2004 Municipal elections from the former St Mary's ward and includes the Garston, Speke and Oglet areas. The population of this ward at the 2011 census was 20,300.

The resignation of Liberal Democrat Cllr Danny Hughes led to a by election taking place on 8 March 2007, which was subsequently won by the Labour candidate, Colin Strickland.

Councillors
The ward has returned seven Councillors

 indicates seat up for re-election after boundary changes.

 indicates seat up for re-election.

 indicates change in affiliation.

 indicates seat up for re-election after casual vacancy.

Election results

Elections of the 2010s

Elections of the 2000s 

After the boundary change of 2004 the whole of Liverpool City Council faced election. Three Councillors were returned at this election.

External links
Ward Profile - Speke Garston

References

Wards of Liverpool